Angelica Rozeanu (née Adelstein) (15 October 1921 – 21 February 2006) was a Romanian table tennis player of Jewish origin, the most successful female table tennis player in the history of the sport, winning the women's world singles title 6 years in succession.

Table tennis career
Rozeanu started playing table tennis while recovering from scarlet fever when she was eight. In 1933, at age 12, she won the Romanian Cup. She won the Romanian national championship in 1936 and remained Romania's female champion for the next 21 years (1936–57, excluding World War II). Her first major win was the 1938 Hungarian Open.

Her career was interrupted by World War II, as from 1940 to 1944 she was barred from even entering a gymnasium in Romania and was unable to play.

Rozeanu won her first World Championship in 1950, starting the winning run that would see her win the championship six years in succession, a feat yet to be matched.  She was also the last non-Asian woman to win the title. In total, she won 17 world titles (and 12 silver and bronze medals at the World Championships), three world women's doubles titles, and three world mixed doubles titles.  By far Romania's greatest profile in the sport, she was also the President of the Romanian Table Tennis Commission from 1950 to 1960.

Rozeanu emigrated to Israel in 1960. She won the 1961 Maccabiah Games Women's Table Tennis Championship, and was Israel's champion in 1960–62. She kept in touch with her native Romania, and visited it for the last time in 2005. In 2006, she died at the age of 84.

Recognition
Rozeanu was given the Romanian title of Merited Master of Sport in 1954.  She has also received four Order of Work honors. In 1997 she was awarded the Knesset Medal. She was awarded the title of Honorary Citizen of Haifa in 2001.

She was inducted into the International Jewish Sports Hall of Fame in 1981 and into the ITTF Hall of Fame in 1995.

See also
List of Jewish Romanians 
List of World Table Tennis Championships medalists

References

Sources

Profile at ITTF News
Obituary at The Telegraph 

Jacov Sobovitz, Angelica Adelstein Rozeanu, Jewish Women Encyclopedia

1921 births
2006 deaths
Romanian Jews
Sportspeople from Bucharest
Jewish table tennis players
Jewish Romanian sportspeople
Romanian female table tennis players
Romanian emigrants to Israel
Romanian people of Israeli descent
Israeli Jews
Maccabiah Games tennis players
Deaths from cirrhosis
Maccabiah Games gold medalists for Israel
Maccabiah Games medalists in table tennis
Competitors at the 1961 Maccabiah Games